Sardar Fateh Muhammad Khan Buzdar (1939 – April 1, 2019) was a Pakistani politician who was a member of the Provincial Assembly of the Punjab from 1985 to 1988 and from 2002 to 2013.
He died on the 1st of April 2019. He was Tumandar of Buzdar (tribe)  .

Early life and education
He was born in Barthi, Tribal Area of Dera Ghazi Khan District. He obtained the degree of Masters of Arts in political science from University of Karachi in 1964 . He was the tumandar of Baloch tribe Buzdar.

Political career
He was elected to the Provincial Assembly of the Punjab as an independent candidate in 1985 Pakistani general election.

He was re-elected to the Provincial Assembly of the Punjab as a candidate of Pakistan Muslim League (Q) (PML-Q) from PP-241 (Dera Ghazi Khan-II) in 2002 Pakistani general election.
 
He was re-elected to the Provincial Assembly of the Punjab as a candidate of PML-Q from PP-241 (Dera Ghazi Khan-II) in 2008 Pakistani general election.

References

1939 births
2019 deaths
Punjab MPAs 1985–1988
Punjab MPAs 2002–2007
Punjab MPAs 2008–2013
Pakistani people convicted of murder
Pakistan Muslim League (Q) MPAs (Punjab)
University of Karachi alumni
Tumandars
People from Dera Ghazi Khan District
Baloch people